Súper X is a Mexican comedy television series produced by Miguel Ángel Fox for Blim. The first season was released on January 20, 2017. A second season has been confirmed.

Super X tells the story of Alex a normal guy, who works in a video game store, lives with his mother, has bad luck with women and spends time with two friends who are his worst advisers: Lalo, an eccentric and privileged young man whose dream is to be a recognized actor, and Simon, his spotted and plump cousin.

Synopsis 
As a result of an unfortunate accident, Alex acquires powers, however, he will continue to lead the same life of loser with his friends Lalo and Simón, while trying to conquer without much success Vicky, his platonic love.

Cast 
 Axel Ricco as Alex
 Mauricio Llera as Lalo
 Paco Rueda as Simón
 Michelle Renaud as Vicky
 Claudia Ramírez as Ofelia
 Regina Blandón as Tatiana
 Mavi Navarro as Nina
 Mariluz Bermúdez as Laura "Madame Frida"
 Manuel "Flaco" Ibáñez as "La Cigarra carmesi"

Episodes

Series overview

Season 1 (2017)

Season 2 (2018)

References

External links 

Blim TV original programming
2017 Mexican television series debuts
Television series by Televisa
Mexican comedy television series
2010s comedy television series